Tlapanec , or Meꞌphaa, is an indigenous Mexican language spoken by more than 98,000 Tlapanec people in the state of Guerrero. Like other Oto-Manguean languages, it is tonal and has complex inflectional morphology. The ethnic group themselves refer to their ethnic identity and language as Me̱ꞌpha̱a̱ .

Before much information was known about it, Tlapanec (sometimes written "Tlappanec" in earlier publications) was either considered unclassified or linked to the controversial Hokan language family. It is now definitively considered part of the Oto-Manguean language family, of which it forms its own branch along with the extinct and very closely related Subtiaba language of Nicaragua.

Meꞌphaa people temporarily move to other locations, including Mexico City, Morelos and various locations in the United States, for reasons of work.

Varieties
Ethnologue distinguishes four Tlapanec languages:
Acatepec (dialects Acatepec proper, Huitzapula, Nanzintla, Teocuitlapa, Zapotitlán Tablas)
Azoyú
Malinaltepec (dialect Huehuetepec/Zilacayotitlán)
Tlacoapa (dialects Tlacoapa proper, Tenamazapa)

Other sources of information, including native speakers and the Instituto Nacional de Lenguas Indígenas of the Mexican government, identify eight or nine varieties, which have been given official status: Acatepec, Azoyú, Malinaltepec, Tlacoapa, Nancintla, Teocuitlapa, Zapotitlán Tablas (with Huitzapula sometimes considered distinct), Zilacayotitlán. These share mutual intelligibility of 50% between Malinaltepec and Tlacoapa, though Acatepec has an 80% intelligibility of both.

The Azoyú variety is the only natural language reported to have used the pegative case, though it is verbal case like other 'case' markers in Tlapanec.

Grammar
Tlapanec is an ergative–absolutive language. However, while most languages of this type have an overt ergative case, Tlapanec is one of the rare examples of a marked absolutive language, that is, an ergative language that overtly marks the absolutive and leaves the ergative unmarked.

Phonology
The following presents one view of the phonology of the Malinaltepec Tlapanec language, but a view that looks at Tlapanec language with a broader view has resulted in a quite different analysis.

Vowels

Consonants 

Allophones of the sounds  include . In the existence of the cluster , an allophone  may be heard.

The glottal stop is written with a saltillo .

Media
Tlapanec-language programming is carried by the CDI's radio station XEZV-AM, broadcasting from Tlapa de Comonfort, Guerrero.

Notes

References

 
 
 
 
 
 
 
 
 
 
 
 
 
</ref>

External links
 SIL description of Tlapanecan languages
 Listen to a sample of Acatepec Meꞌphaa from Global Recordings Network

Mesoamerican languages
Indigenous languages of Mexico
Oto-Manguean languages